Li Wei (born January 1958) is a Chinese politician and the current chairman of the Standing Committee of the Beijing Municipal People's Congress. A native of Zhangjiagang, Jiangsu, Li entered the workforce in June 1975 and joined the Chinese Communist Party (CCP) in July 1977. Li graduated from Nanjing University with an undergraduate major in Chinese language and a master's degree in law.

In May 2013, Li was appointed as a standing member of the CCP Beijing Municipal Committee, as well as head of the Committee's propaganda department. In January 2017, he was transferred to serve as chairman of the Standing Committee of the Beijing Municipal People's Congress. In January 2018, Li was elected as a Beijing delegate to the 13th National People's Congress.

References 

Nanjing University alumni
Living people
1958 births
People's Republic of China politicians from Jiangsu
Chinese Communist Party politicians from Jiangsu
Political office-holders in Beijing
People from Zhangjiagang